Nuno Mindelis (born August 7, 1957, in Cabinda, Angola), nicknamed "The Beast from Brazil", is an Angolan-born Brazilian blues guitarist and singer-songwriter.

Most of his recorded work has been sung in English; however, he recorded his 2006 album Outros Nunos in Portuguese, his native language. He has recorded two albums with the band Double Trouble. Mindelis counts Otis Redding and Johnny Winter among his musical influences.

Life and career
Mindelis became a guitar enthusiast at the age of 5. By the age of 9 he began building and playing self-made guitars. A primary influence at that time was Otis Redding and his rhythm section, Booker T. & the MG's.

In 1990, an independent recording he had made began to receive airplay on local radio stations. In 1991, he recorded his debut solo album, Blues & Derivados, which received positive reviews in Brazilian media. In 1992, he recorded his second solo album, Long Distance Blues for Movieplay Records. In this album Mindelis was joined by Larry McCray, and the French harmonica player, J.J. Milteau. As part of his promotional tour for the album, Mindelis played at a blues festival in São Paulo, featuring Robert Cray, Otis Clay, Ronnie Earl, Lonnie Brooks and Bo Diddley.

In 1994, Guitar Player magazine profiled Mindelis. Further recognition came in their May 1998 issue, as Mindelis was selected as "Best Blues Guitarist" in the 30th Anniversary Guitar Player competition. In 1995, Mindelis played at Antone's 20th Anniversary in Austin, Texas, opening for Guy Forsite and Junior Wells others. Clarence "Gatemouth" Brown and Storyville also performed at the event.

Later that year, Mindelis recorded his album Texas Bound, featuring Tommy Shannon and Chris Layton, of Stevie Ray Vaughan's rhythm section, Double Trouble. Texas Bound was the 12th best selling album seller in Benelux.

In 1999, Mindelis released Blues on the Outside. Mindelis appeared at the 25th edition of the Montreal International Jazz Festival in 2001, and did other presentations in Quebec, Ottawa. Mindelis played at the festival again in 2004, after the release of his album Twelve Hours, and again played Quebec and Ottawa, and also the Montremblant Blues Festival, sharing the stages with Keb' Mo' and Jimmie Vaughan. Andy Grieg in Canada's Real Blues magazine asked, "Is the new King of the blues a man based in Brazil?"

In 2005, Mindelis recorded the album, Outros Nunos, dedicated to Brazil, with all of the songs sung in Portuguese and including versions of Brazilian music standards.

In 2010 he releases Free Blues, entirely produced and played by himself. The idea was to re-create blues and rock classics that so much influenced him in his adolescence times under a new approach, with the help of electronics and new elements, such as rap and other more contemporary effects. Critics praised : "Brilliant – Just brilliant! 'What a gorgeous idea of giving the old standards a new flame." by Taxim Records, Germany." 

"You will find one of the best guitaring around" – Carol Borrington – Blues Matters / England  

In 2014 Nuno again plays the Montreal International Jazz Festival, followed by a tour in several cities of Quebec.

In 2013 the Album Angels & Clowns was released by Duke Robillard's / Finkelstein's label Duchess Blue / Shining Stone, produced by Duke Robillard who also played in the record. The album received rave reviews, some excerpts: 

"Nuno is just new to me, and his latest, Angels & Clowns is a blistering blues masterpiece...“My goal was to do that with good songs, and good melodies, and Duke Robillard — who is a pillar, a giant of blues guitar — also helped me create the best guitar and vocal performances I’ve ever recorded.” Critics have mentioned Mindelis in the same breath with Page, Hendrix and Stevie Ray, and I agree.” By Jim Clark THE COURIER

“A Superb Blues Musician whose tone on the guitar is a joy to listen”
Ü  The songwriting and the musicianship on the album are sublime and I was completely blown away by the quality of the blues being played here" . Adrian Blackee – Blues Matters Magazine- England

'Nuno Mindelis is a brilliant talent with dazzling guitar playing, and I would like to thank Duke robillard for introducing us to him. I look forward to hearing more from this outstanding artist.
A Guitar Solo that legends are made of.'
Malcom Kennedy – Washington Blues Society

“The opening track has very rough tone and it wakes you up straight away (...) While many of the today’s guitar players will receive only smoke without fire, Mindelis makes the flame that burns bright and clean.
– Riku Metelinen – Blues News – Finland

2018 Nuno recorded his first live album during the Suwalki Blues Festival / Poland, where he was a headliner alongside Eric Burdon & The Animals, Billy Gibbons, Mavis Staples. The show was considered as one of the best and Nuno is now in the Suwalki Festival's Walk of Fame, alongside the biggest names ever in the blues – rock scene, like Mick Taylor, Doyle Bramhall, The Yardbirds,  Jack Bruce and Ginger Baker, the Blues Brothers (original) Joe Bonamassa etc.

2020 sees the gradual release of the album Angola Blues, the most touching and beloved to Nuno, a tribute to the country where he was born and lived until he was 17 years old, Angola. The first single 'Cabinda' came out January 24 on all streaming platforms, the second and third are scheduled for February and March and the full album for April. Nuno has stated several times that this album is like his' St.Peppers "

Discography
Blues e Derivados (1989)
Long Distance Blues (1992)
Texas Bound (1996) (feat. Double Trouble former SRV Rhythm Section Chris Layton Drums – Tommy Shannon / Bass – Lou Ann Barton / Backing Vocals)
Nuno Mindelis &  the Cream Crackers (1998) (a reissue of Long Distance Blues with a different title without the knowledge / approval of the author)
Blues on the Outside (1999)
Twelve Hours (2003)
Outros Nunos (2005)
Free Blues (2010)
Angels & Clowns (Feat. The Duke Robillard Band) (2013)
Live At The Suwalki Festival / Poland 2018
'Cabinda (single) 2020

References

External links
Official website

1957 births
Living people
Blues guitarists
Brazilian singer-songwriters
Brazilian guitarists
Brazilian male guitarists